The following lists events that happened during 2013 in Cape Verde.

Incumbents
President: Jorge Carlos Fonseca
Prime Minister: José Maria Neves

Events
June: A campus of the Universidade de Santiago opened in Tarrafal
 October 24 - Cape Verde decrees the official English-language rendering of its name to be the Republic of Cabo Verde.

Sports

CS Mindelense won the Cape Verdean Football Championship

Deaths
Bana (b. 1932), singer and performer

References

 
Years of the 21st century in Cape Verde
2010s in Cape Verde
Cape Verde
Cape Verde